Renato Piau de Sa (born December 19, 1992) is a Brazilian football player.

Club statistics

References

External links

1992 births
Living people
Brazilian footballers
Brazilian expatriate footballers
Expatriate footballers in Japan
J2 League players
Ventforet Kofu players
Association football forwards